Camillo Alphonzo Johannes Peter Carlsen   (19 January 1876 – 4 October 1948) was a Danish composer.

Notable works
Forår (sangcyklus 1895)
Violinromance (1895)
Strygekvartet nr. 1 i d-mol (1895)
8 Klaverstykker (1895)
Sørgemusik ved Frederik d. VIIIs Bisættelse i Roskilde Domkirke (Adagio funèbre - violin, cello og orgel - 1912)
Nocturne (orkester 1944)
Berceuse (orkester 1944)
Adagio funèbre (orkester 1945)

References
This article was initially translated from the Danish Wikipedia.

1876 births
1948 deaths
Danish composers
Male composers
Place of birth missing